Gabbatha (Aramaic גבתא) is the Aramaic name of a place in Jerusalem that is also referred to by the Greek name of  (Greek ). It is recorded in the gospels to be the place of the trial of Jesus before his crucifixion  30/33 AD. The site of the Church of Ecce Homo is traditionally thought to be its location, but archaeological investigation has proven this unlikely. Herod's Palace is a more likely location.

Etymology
 (from  ‘stone’ and   ‘covered’) occurs in the Bible only once, in John 19:13. 
It states that Pontius Pilate:

 brought Jesus forth, and sat down in the judgment seat, in the place that is called Lithostrotos, and in Hebrew Gabbatha.

The name "Gabbatha" is an Aramaic word, the language spoken commonly at the time in Judea. It is not a mere translation of Lithostrotos, which properly means the tessellated or mosaic pavement where the judgment-seat stood, but which was extended to the place itself in front of Pilate's praetorium, where that pavement was laid. This was proved by the practice of St. John, who elsewhere gives Aramaic names as distinctly belonging to places, not as mere translations of the Greek. This is proved also because Gabbatha is derived from a root meaning 'back' or 'elevation' – which refers not to the kind of pavement, but to the elevation of the place in question. It thus appears that the two names "Lithostrotos" and "Gabbatha" were due to different characteristics of the spot where Pilate condemned Jesus to death. The Aramaic name was derived from the configuration of that spot, with the Greek name derived from the nature of its pavement.

Identification
Efforts have been made by commentators to identify Gabbatha either with the outer court of the Temple, which is known to have been paved, or with the meeting-place of the Great Sanhedrin, which was half within, half without that Temple's outer court, or again with the ridge at the back of the House of the Lord; but these efforts cannot be considered as successful.

According to Pierre Benoit, Pilate carried out his judgements at Herod's Palace at the southwest side of the city, rather than at this point in the city's northeast corner. Archaeological studies have confirmed that the Roman pavement at these two traditional stations was built by Hadrian in the 2nd century AD as the flooring of the eastern forum of Aelia Capitolina. Prior to Hadrian's changes, the area had been a large open-air pool of water, the Struthion Pool mentioned by Josephus. The pool still survives under vaulting added by Hadrian so that the forum could be built over it, and can be accessed from the portion of Roman paving under the Convent of the Sisters of Zion, and from the Western Wall Tunnel.

A triple-arched gateway built by Hadrian as an entrance to the eastern forum of Aelia Capitolina was traditionally, but as archaeological investigation shows, mistakenly, said to have been part of the gate of Herod's Antonia Fortress. This was alleged to be the location of Jesus' trial and Pilate's ecce homo speech.

References

This article incorporates text from the public domain Catholic Encyclopedia.

New Testament places